Varosh is a village in Ferizaj Municipality, Kosovo. According to the Kosovo Agency of Statistics (KAS) estimate from the 2011 census, there were 2,483 people residing in Gaçkë, with Albanians constituting the majority of the population.

Notes

References 

Villages in Ferizaj